The sixth edition of the Amstel Gold Race for Women was a road cycling one-day race held on 21 April 2019 in the Netherlands. It was the seventh event of the 2019 UCI Women's World Tour. The race started in Maastricht and finished in Berg en Terblijt, containing 19 categorised climbs and covering a total distance of 127 km. It was won by Katarzyna Niewiadoma.

Teams
Eighteen teams participated in the race. Each team has a maximum of six riders:

Result

References

2019 UCI Women's World Tour
2019 in Dutch sport
Amstel Gold Race
April 2019 sports events in the Netherlands